Ephedrine/ethylmorphine (Lepheton) is a combination drug used as an antitussive. It consists of ethylmorphine (an opiate) and ephedrine (a sympathomimetic).

References

Combination drugs
Antitussives